MOLEC, the European Conference on the Dynamics of Molecular Systems, is a biannual scientific conference.   It is held every two years usually late summer. The first conference was held in Trento, Italy in the year of 1976.

Conference locations
The conference has been held in the following locations:

 Trento (Italy), 1976, organized by Peter Toennies and Franco Gianturco
 Brandbjerg Hojskole (Denmark), 1978
 Oxford (UK), 1980
 Nijmegen (The Netherlands), 1982
 Jerusalem (Israel), 1984
 Aussois (France), 1986
 Assisi (Italy), 1988
 Bernkastel-Kues (Germany), 1990
 Prague (Czech Republic), 1992
 Salamanca (Spain), 1994
 Nyborg Strand (Denmark), 1996
 Bristol (UK), 1998
 Jerusalem (Israel), 2000
 Istanbul (Turkey), 2002
 Nunspeet (The Netherlands), 2004
 Trento (Italy), 2006
 St. Petersburg (Russia), 2008 
 Curia (Portugal), 2010 
 Oxford (UK),  2012
 Gothenburg (Sweden), 2014 
 Toledo (Spain), 2016, chair Alberto Garcia Vela
 Dinard (France), 2018

MOLEC Prizes
MOLEC Senior Prize

 1996: Prof Jan Peter Toennies 
 1998: Prof. Franco Gianturco
 2004: Prof Raphael Levine
 2006: Prof. Zdenek Herman
 2008: Prof. Gabriel Balint-Jurti
 2016: Prof. Dieter Gerlich
 2018: Prof David Parker

Zdenek Herman MOLEC Young Scientist Prize
 2016: Prof. Sebastiaan Y. T. van de Meerakker
 2018: Prof Francesca Calegari

References 

Physics conferences
Chemistry conferences